The Asia/Oceania Zone was one of the three zones of the regional Davis Cup competition in 2000.

In the Asia/Oceania Zone there were four different tiers, called groups, in which teams competed against each other to advance to the upper tier. Winners in Group I advanced to the World Group Qualifying Round, along with losing teams from the World Group first round. Teams who lost their respective ties competed in the relegation play-offs, with winning teams remaining in Group I, whereas teams who lost their play-offs were relegated to the Asia/Oceania Zone Group II in 2001.

Participating nations

Draw

 relegated to Group II in 2001.
 and  advance to World Group Qualifying Round.

First round

China vs. Uzbekistan

New Zealand vs. Thailand

India vs. Lebanon

Japan vs. South Korea

Second round

Uzbekistan vs. New Zealand

India vs. South Korea

First round relegation play-offs

China vs. Thailand

Japan vs. Lebanon

Second round relegation play-offs

Lebanon vs. China

References

External links
Davis Cup official website

Davis Cup Asia/Oceania Zone
Asia Oceania Zone Group I